Moscow City Duma District 44 is one of 45 constituencies in Moscow City Duma. The constituency covers parts of Central Moscow. District 44 was created in 2013, after Moscow City Duma had been expanded from 35 to 45 seats. Kremlin, Government of Moscow and Moscow City Duma are located within district's boundaries.

Members elected

Election results

2014

|-
! colspan=2 style="background-color:#E9E9E9;text-align:left;vertical-align:top;" |Candidate
! style="background-color:#E9E9E9;text-align:left;vertical-align:top;" |Party
! style="background-color:#E9E9E9;text-align:right;" |Votes
! style="background-color:#E9E9E9;text-align:right;" |%
|-
|style="background-color:"|
|align=left|Yelena Shuvalova
|align=left|Communist Party
|
|39.16%
|-
|style="background-color:"|
|align=left|Ilya Sviridov
|align=left|A Just Russia
|
|34.70%
|-
|style="background-color:"|
|align=left|Aleksandr Gnezdilov
|align=left|Yabloko
|
|16.12%
|-
|style="background-color:"|
|align=left|Konstantin Ponomaryov
|align=left|Liberal Democratic Party
|
|6.73%
|-
| colspan="5" style="background-color:#E9E9E9;"|
|- style="font-weight:bold"
| colspan="3" style="text-align:left;" | Total
| 
| 100%
|-
| colspan="5" style="background-color:#E9E9E9;"|
|- style="font-weight:bold"
| colspan="4" |Source:
|
|}

2019

|-
! colspan=2 style="background-color:#E9E9E9;text-align:left;vertical-align:top;" |Candidate
! style="background-color:#E9E9E9;text-align:left;vertical-align:top;" |Party
! style="background-color:#E9E9E9;text-align:right;" |Votes
! style="background-color:#E9E9E9;text-align:right;" |%
|-
|style="background-color:"|
|align=left|Yelena Shuvalova (incumbent)
|align=left|Communist Party
|
|44.99%
|-
|style="background-color:"|
|align=left|Ilya Sviridov
|align=left|Independent
|
|42.37%
|-
|style="background-color:"|
|align=left|Nadezhda Shalimova
|align=left|Independent
|
|4.83%
|-
|style="background-color:"|
|align=left|Yekaterina Nechayeva
|align=left|Liberal Democratic Party
|
|4.61%
|-
| colspan="5" style="background-color:#E9E9E9;"|
|- style="font-weight:bold"
| colspan="3" style="text-align:left;" | Total
| 
| 100%
|-
| colspan="5" style="background-color:#E9E9E9;"|
|- style="font-weight:bold"
| colspan="4" |Source:
|
|}

References

Moscow City Duma districts